Kalevi Johannes Laitinen (19 May 1918 – 6 January 1997) was a Finnish gymnast and Olympic champion.

He was born and died in Kotka.

Laitinen competed at the 1948 Summer Olympics in London where he received a gold medal in team combined exercises. 
At the 1952 Summer Olympics in Helsinki he received a bronze medal in team combined exercises with the Finnish team.

References

1918 births
1997 deaths
People from Kotka
Finnish male artistic gymnasts
Olympic gymnasts of Finland
Gymnasts at the 1948 Summer Olympics
Gymnasts at the 1952 Summer Olympics
Olympic gold medalists for Finland
Olympic medalists in gymnastics
Medalists at the 1952 Summer Olympics
Medalists at the 1948 Summer Olympics
Olympic bronze medalists for Finland
Sportspeople from Kymenlaakso
20th-century Finnish people